The 2014 version of the Syrian Cup is the 44th edition to be played. It is the premier knockout tournament for football teams in Syria. Al-Wahda are the defending champions of the last two editions.

The competition has been disrupted because of the ongoing Syrian Civil War, where some games have been awarded as 3–0 victories due to teams not being able to compete.

The winners of the competition enter the 2015 AFC Cup.

First round

Second round

Quarter-finals

Semi-finals

Final

External links 
http://www.futbol24.com/national/Syria/Syrian-Cup/2014/ futbol24.com

References

2014
2014 domestic association football cups
Cup